Events from the year 1906 in Sweden

Incumbents
 Monarch – Oscar II
 Prime Minister – Karl Staaff (until May 29), Arvid Lindman (starting May 29)

Events

 Swedish Electricians' Union is founded. 
 Swedish Commercial Employees' Union is founded.
 1906 spelling reform

Births

 8 March – Victor Hasselblad, inventor

Deaths

 28 November – Oskar Andersson, cartoonist  (born 1877) 
 Hilda Elfving, educator
 Wilhelmina Josephson, pianist

References

 
Years of the 20th century in Sweden
Sweden